Hawaiian Buckaroo is a 1938 American Western film directed by Ray Taylor and written by Daniel Jarrett. The film stars Smith Ballew, Evalyn Knapp, Harry Woods, Pat J. O'Brien, George Regas and Benny Burt. The film was released on January 14, 1938, by 20th Century Fox.

Plot

Cast   
Smith Ballew as Jeff Howard
Evalyn Knapp as Paula Harrington
Harry Woods as J. P. M'Tigue
Pat J. O'Brien as Steve Wainwright
George Regas as Regas
Benny Burt as Mike
Laura Treadwell as Aunt Julia Fraser

Adaptation
Ballew starred in an adaptation of the film on the CBS radio program Hollywood Showcase on November 14, 1937.

References

External links 
 

1938 films
20th Century Fox films
American Western (genre) films
1938 Western (genre) films
Films directed by Ray Taylor
American black-and-white films
Films produced by Sol Lesser
1930s English-language films
1930s American films